Karan Rastogi and Divij Sharan were the defending champions but decided not to participate.
Sanchai Ratiwatana and Sonchat Ratiwatana won the title, defeating Gong Maoxin and Zhang Ze 6–4, 6–2 in the final.

Seeds

Draw

Draw

References
 Main Draw

Ningbo Challenger - Doubles
2012 Doubles